Mary Gay Humphreys (1843 - 1915) was an American journalist and author. She is best known for her writings in mulitple news outlets, and her books including one on Catherine Schuyler, a socialite in Colonial America.

Life 
She was born in Ripley, Ohio in 1843 to William Smith Humphreys and Henrietta Somerville Write and died in 1915. She served as a nurse in the Civil War and the Philippines.

Writings 
Humphreys was wrote in multiple periodicals including The Art Amateur, Scribner's Sons, Harper's Bazaar, Harper's Weekly, The Evening Sun, and The Chicago Inter-Ocean.In 1885, she co-authored, using the pen name Elinor Gray, a book with American Christian author, William Boardman. The book was called Skilful Susy: A Book of Fairs and Bazars, and it reviewed ouvrages de dames, fancy work, and other craft-work required in an 18th century household. Her next book, Catherine Schuyler, was a biography of Catherine Van Rensselaer Schuyler who was born in colonial New York to a prominent Dutch family and provides insight into the daily toils of upper-class 18th century women.  

Humphreys then used the nom-de-plume, Henry Somerville, for her next two books. When Jack Racer was first published, the news described the author Henry Somerville as a native of Ohio who worked in the newspaper business and who had been encouraged by his mother to write fiction. Later it was revealed that Somerville was the nom-de-plume of Humphreys. Humphreys went on to publish a sequel, Racer of Illinois, in 1902.

Her final book, Missionary Explorers Among the American Indians, was included as a volume in Scribner's in 1913. The article was devoted to the lives of six American missionaries: John Eliot, Samson Occum, David Brainerd, Marcus Whitman, Stephen Riggs and John Lewis Dyer.

Selected publications

References 

1843 births
1915 deaths
American women journalists
American women writers
People from Ripley, Ohio